The Oilliphéist is a sea serpent-like monster in Irish mythology and folklore.

These monsters were believed to inhabit many lakes and rivers in Ireland and there are many legends of saints and heroes fighting them. In one story, the Oilliphéist cuts the route of the River Shannon when it hears that Saint Patrick has come to drive out it and its kind. In a comic addition to the story, the monster swallows a drunken piper named Ó Ruairc (O'Rourke). The piper is either unaware of his predicament or is completely unperturbed and continues to play inside the Oilliphéist's stomach. The monster becomes so annoyed with Ó Ruairc's music that it coughs him up and spits him out. It is believed by Chris Cairney that this story and one involving Caoránach helped influence and inspire the legend of the Loch Ness Monster.

Other stories of the Oilliphéist exist. One has a girl named Sionnan, grand daughter of Manannán mac Lir, anger the Salmon of Knowledge by throwing stones at it. In revenge the fish summons and asks an Oilliphéist to attack the girl which it does and ultimately ends up killing her.

Caoránach

In Irish folklore, Caoránach (sometimes Coal) was an Oilliphéist and said to be the mother of demons who was banished by Saint Patrick to Lough Dearg in Donegal, Ulster.

According to earlier legend Fionn mac Cumhaill and the Fianna were asked to slay a Hag in the Lough Dearg region. She was struck by an arrow from a large distance and as such her body was lost. Eventually the Fianna happened upon her body and were warned to not break the thigh bone as it would release a dangerous monster.

One person named Conan broke the bone and released a small hairy worm. This worm quickly grew into a large sea monster named Caoránach that began to eat the cattle in the land. After almost all the cattle in Ulster were eaten the locals blamed Conan for the trouble, enraged he entered the monsters mouth with a sword and killed it. Lough Dearg is named after the blood that came out of Caoránach dyes the rocks red.

In a more Christianised version of the story, Saint Patrick arrives to the area and is told about the monster's existence. He arrived at the region and continued to argue with the beast before slaying it himself. Its blood dyed the lake red and in some tales Saint Patrick then declared the lake should be called Lough Derg from then on. In some variants of the tale Saint Patrick failed at this and the monster lives in Lough Derg to this day.

See also 

 Muirdris
 Each-uisge

References

External links

Aos Sí
European dragons
Fairies
Fantasy creatures
Irish folklore
Irish legendary creatures
Mythological monsters
Scottish legendary creatures
Tuatha Dé Danann
Sea serpents